In the American Region for Rugby World Cup Qualifying, two teams, Canada and USA, qualified directly to the world cup and the third place, Uruguay, entered a playoff against the third place European team and the second place African and Asian teams.

The qualification process started with regional qualification tournaments. First a Caribbean tournament in the Cayman Islands during April 2008, was won by Trinidad and Tobago. South America's Second Division 2008 South American Rugby (division B) was the next tournament to take place. Brazil won on the final day in Paraguay. 

The two regional champions advanced to a playoff to decide who would face Uruguay and Chile in Round 3A.  Brazil won both legs of the two-match series for the right to participate in the 2009 South American Rugby Championship A Division, which was won by Uruguay.  Uruguay then faced the United States to determine the Americas 2 seed.

On July 11, 2009, Canada claimed the Americas 1 seed, making them the first team to qualify for the 2011 Rugby World Cup. The USA followed on November 21 to claim the Americas 2 seed, sending Uruguay to the playoffs for the final place.

18 teams participated in the qualifying process.  For 2007 there were 19.  Changes in participation levels were due to Argentina earning a spot in the 2011 tournament with their performance in 2007, Saint Lucia not participating, and Mexico making their Rugby World Cup qualifying debut.

Round 1A (Caribbean Regional Tournament) - April 2008
The Caribbean Regional Championships held in the Cayman Islands was the first Qualifying event for the Rugby World Cup 2011.  The Tournament included the nine eligible IRB members from the Caribbean & Central America.  Mexico was competing in their first major international competition as one of the IRB's newest members.  The Mexicans faced Saint Vincent and the Grenadines in a preliminary qualifying match to determine the final eight.  The match was played at the Arnos Vale Ground in Kingstown, Saint Vincent and the Grenadines.   In addition to determining a champion, the tournament played out each final position.  The tournament was won by Trinidad and Tobago who advanced to Round 2 of the qualifying process.  The main tournament was hosted by the Cayman Islands, with all matches being played at Truman Bodden Stadium in George Town. Attendance at this tournament varied throughout, but the maximum attendance was calculated at 1,395 during the final.

Teams

 (Team eliminated in the preliminary round)

Round 1B (South American Consur B Championships) - June 2008
This round is also the 2008 South American Rugby Championship B Division, a competition for second tier South American nations. The tournament was played at Colegio de San José in Asuncion, Paraguay in June 2008. The winners were Brazil who beat hosts Paraguay on the final day. They advanced to Round 2 to face Trinidad and Tobago. Brazil and Paraguay were promoted to the Division A of the Consur.

Standings
{| class="wikitable"
|-
!width=165|Team
!width=40|Played
!width=40|Won
!width=40|Drawn
!width=40|Lost
!width=40|For
!width=40|Against
!width=40|Difference
!width=40|BP
!width=40|Pts
|- bgcolor=#ccffcc align=center
|align=left| 
|4||4||0||0||169||20||+149||3||19
|- align=center
|align=left| 
|4||3||0||1||181||25||+156||3||15
|- align=center
|align=left| 
|4||2||0||2||86||123||-37||2||10
|- align=center
|align=left| 
|4||1||0||3||53||148||-95||0||4
|- align=center
|align=left| 
|4||0||0||4||23||196||-173||1||1
|}

Matches

Round 2 (Regional Champions Playoff)
This playoff was between the two regional champions of Round 1. The winner of the playoff progressed to join Uruguay and Chile in Round 3A.

Brazil advanced by winning the series two matches to none.

Round 3A (South America Consur A Championships) - April/May 2009
This round was also the 2009 South American Rugby Championship A Division, a competition for first tier South American nations. The tournament was played in Montevideo, Uruguay (with the exception of the first match played in Viña del Mar, Chile) in April and May 2009. Paraguay participated in the tournament; however, their participation was limited to the Consur A Championship and their results had no bearing on Rugby World Cup qualifying.  Uruguay, who defeated Chile and Brazil, qualified for Round 4 to face the loser of Round 3B.

Standings
{| class="wikitable"
|-
!width=165|Team
!width=40|Played
!width=40|Won
!width=40|Drawn
!width=40|Lost
!width=40|For
!width=40|Against
!width=40|Difference
!width=40|Points
|- align=center
|align=left| 
|2||2||0||0||117||12||+105||6
|- align=center
|align=left| 
|2||1||0||1||88||49||+39||4
|- align=center
|align=left| 
|2||0||0||2||6||150||-144||2
|}

Round 3B (North American Qualification Playoff)
This round was a two legged playoff between the USA and Canada. The winner, Canada, qualified for Pool A of the 2011 Rugby World Cup as Americas 1; the USA moved on to Round 4.

Series drawn 1-1.  Canada won on aggregate 47 - 30.

Round 4 (Final American Qualification Playoff)
This two-legged playoff between Uruguay, the winner of South American Qualification (Round 3A), and the USA, the loser of the North American Playoff (Round 3B) qualified the United States for Pool C of the Rugby World Cup as Americas 2, while Uruguay advanced to the Final Place Playoff as Americas 3 to face Kazakhstan (the second place Asian team) in the semifinal.

USA won the series 2–0 and 54–28 on aggregate.

Uruguay v USA

USA v Uruguay

See also
Rugby World Cup
2011 Rugby World Cup
2011 Rugby World Cup qualifying

External links
Confirmation of draw

References 

2011
Americas
2008 in South American rugby union
2009 in South American rugby union
2008 in North American rugby union
2009 in North American rugby union